Jérémy Corinus (born 16 March 1997) is a French professional footballer who plays as a defender for Liga I side Chindia Târgoviște.

Club career
On 11 February 2020, Corinus sign with Ajaccio first team.

On 18 August 2021, he moved to Italy and signed for Serie C club Fermana. On 31 January 2022, his contract with Fermana was terminated by mutual consent.

References

1997 births
Living people
Footballers from Essonne
French footballers
Association football defenders
Ligue 2 players
Championnat National 3 players
AC Ajaccio players
Serie C players
Fermana F.C. players
FCV Farul Constanța players
Liga I players
LPS HD Clinceni players
AFC Chindia Târgoviște players
French expatriate footballers
French expatriate sportspeople in Italy
Expatriate footballers in Italy
French expatriate sportspeople in Romania
Expatriate footballers in Romania